Dronningkrona is a  tall mountain peak in Sunndal Municipality in Møre og Romsdal county, Norway. It is one of the two peaks on the main mountain Vinnufjellet. Its neighbor peak is Kongskrona, which reaches  higher.

References

Mountains of Møre og Romsdal
Sunndal